The southern house spider is a species of large spider in the family Filistatidae. Currently given the scientific name Kukulcania hibernalis, it was formerly known as Filistata hibernalis. Found in the Americas, it exhibits strong sexual dimorphism. It is occurs in the southern states of the USA, throughout Central America and some of the Caribbean, to southern Brazil, Uruguay and Argentina. The males may be mistaken for brown recluses because the two have similar coloration and body structure. However, compared to the brown recluse, male southern house spiders are typically larger in size, lack the distinctive violin shape on their cephalothorax, and have unusually long slender pedipalps. The females are dark brown or black and more compact. The abdomen of the southern house spider is covered with fine velvety light gray hair.

Female southern house spiders are rarely seen, as they build radial webs around crevices, for which reason their family (Filistatidae) is called crevice weavers. Females seldom move except to capture prey caught in their webs.  Males, on the other hand, typically wander in search of insects and females to mate with, having no particular territory.

The southern house spider is a cribellate spider. That is, its spinnerets do not produce adhesive webbing.  Instead, to capture prey the spider uses its legs to comb webbing across its cribellum, a spiked plate near the spinnerets. This combing action frays and tangles the strands, producing a fine, velcro-like netting that ensnares insect legs.

Male southern house spiders sometimes appear aggressive, but they do not bite unless trapped, and their mouthparts are too small to easily penetrate human skin. They do, however, have an unnerving tendency to crawl across anything in their path regardless of whether it is alive. This is not aggression; these spiders are simply nearly blind and cannot see larger animals. Indeed, these spiders instinctively play dead if they feel threatened (a tactic which is effective against their common predators).

Southern house spiders are capable of crawling through crevices as narrow as 1/4 in (0.66 cm) due to their elongated bodies and compact legs.

Reproduction
The southern house spider mating ritual is a lengthy (over an hour) and elaborate process with long periods during which neither the male nor the female moves considerably. When the wandering male encounters a female's web, there may be an initial confrontation where each scares the other. Upon recovering, the male then constructs a large web around the female's crevice. When this web is complete, the male pulls on its strands continuously to draw the female out of her hole, which may take several minutes. Following her emergence, each spider will tap at the other in an effort to grasp the other by the forelegs, with the male remaining suspended in his web.

References

External links

South house spider pictures and info
 Picture of K. hibernalis (free for noncommercial use)
southern house spider on the UF / IFAS Featured Creatures Web site
Kukulcania hibernalis species guide on Spiders.us
K. hibernalis male on BugGuide.net

Filistatidae
Spiders of North America
Spiders of South America
Taxa named by Nicholas Marcellus Hentz